Badger Lee is an unincorporated community and census-designated place in Sequoyah County, Oklahoma, United States. Its population was 76 as of the 2010 census.

Geography

Demographics

References

Unincorporated communities in Sequoyah County, Oklahoma
Unincorporated communities in Oklahoma
Census-designated places in Sequoyah County, Oklahoma
Census-designated places in Oklahoma